4-Methylthioamphetamine (4-MTA) is a designer drug of the substituted amphetamine class developed in the 1990s by a team led by David E. Nichols, an American pharmacologist and medical chemist, at Purdue University. It acts as a non-neurotoxic highly selective serotonin releasing agent (SSRA) in animals. 4-MTA is the methylthio derivative of amphetamine.

History

First appearance 
In 1997, the Forensic Science Laboratory of the Netherlands received reports of three unrelated drug deaths. The substance in question was a new ring-substituted amphetamine derivative. In 1998 two additional cases of this still unknown compound were added to the list, and the incidents were reported to the IPSC (Institut de Police Scientifique et de Criminologie, University of Lausanne, Switzerland). In both the Netherlands and Switzerland, the unknown compound was encountered in the hydrochloride salt form, and pictures of the different tablets were compared to each other. After an investigation, it appeared that in other European countries such as the United Kingdom and Germany the derivative was also encountered. The new drug even got as far as Australia. After analytical research, the compound was identified as 4-methylthioamphetamine (4-MTA). This was an already known compound originally only intended for pharmacological studies on animals. The studies of 4-MTA by David Nichols were then linked to the tablets found in all the different countries.

Development 

4-MTA was developed by the research team led by David Nichols but was intended to be used only as an agent for laboratory research into the serotonin transporter protein. Nichols was reportedly sad to see 4-MTA appear as a drug of abuse on the street. He said after finding out his research was used as a dangerous serotonin releasing drugs, "I was stunned. I had published information ultimately led to human death." Nichols intentions were to discover how MDMA worked in the brain to eventually find a positive use for it in psychotherapy. Nichols studied thereby molecules with similar structure, including 4-MTA. Between 1992 and 1997 they published three papers on the effects of this drug in rats and the idea that it could potentially be used in the treatment of depression and be a potential replacement for Prozac. Without the knowledge of Nichols and his team, others synthesized the drugs into a tablet. These tablets were known by their street name, 'flatliners'. Nichols' laboratory had published that the rats experienced the same euphoric effects as ecstasy, which was probably the motivation for its production and distribution to humans. Nichols also said, "I have never considered my research to be dangerous, and in fact hoped one day to develop medicines to help people." Because of the 4-MTA relating death, Nichols' laboratory was asked to study the human effects of other materials they have studied, to avoid likewise situation as with 4-MTA. Most of the molecules the laboratory further had published could not kill in reasonable dosages.

Use and availability 
The typical tablets sold on the street contained approximately between 100–140 mg 4-MTA. 4-MTA was briefly sold in smart shops in the Netherlands, though was soon banned by the Dutch government after serious side-effects started to emerge. The Union of Smartshop Owners decided to leave it out of their assortment after they discovered the drug had only been tested on rats. It was also briefly sold on the black market as MDMA during the late 1990s, mainly in the US, but proved unpopular due to its high risk of severe side effects (several deaths were reported) and relative lack of positive euphoria.

Effects
4-MTA is a strong serotonin releaser similar to paramethoxyamphetamine (PMA), which can cause pronounced hyperthermia potentially resulting in organ failure and death.[5][6][7][8] Therefore, the major neuropharmacological effect is an increased release of serotonin, and the inhibition of serotonin uptake of mono oxidase A (MAO-A). The combination of the releasing of serotonin from neurons, but the prevention of breaking this neurotransmitter down again, leads to dangerous serotonin syndrome. The serotonin syndrome is a hyper serotonergic state, which can become fatal and is a side effect of serotonergic enhancing drugs. The symptoms of serotonin syndrome are described in the Report on the Risk Assessment of 4-MTA

Symptoms of serotonin syndrome
 Euphoria
 Drowsiness 
 Sustained rapid eye movement 
 Hyperreflexia – overreaction of the reflexes 
 Agitation
 Restlessness
 Tachycardia – fast heart rate
 Headache
 Clumsiness
 Disorientation
 Intoxication – feeling drunk and dizzy
 Rigidity
 Rapid muscle contraction and relaxation in the ankle causing abnormal movements of the foot
 Muscle contraction and relaxation in the jaw
 Muscle twitching leading to hyperthermia
 Shivering
 High body temperature
 Sweating
 Altered mental status (including confusion and hypomania – a 'happy drunk state')

Another effect is the increase of the secretion of several hormones, like adrenocorticotropic hormone (ACTH), corticosterone, prolactin, oxytocin, and renin induced by 4-MTA through stimulation of serotonergic neurotransmission.

There has been suggested that 4-MTA because of its slow onset of action, is more dangerous than other designer drugs. Users of the drug rapidly take another dose because they assume the first was inadequate; leading to overdose (EMCDDA, 1999)

Today the knowledge about the effects of 4-MTA is narrow, because of very limited research and experimental data. The only 4 studies that are conducted show a weak effect on dopamine and noradrenaline. This study was executed with a single dose of 4-MTA, no study where the effect of multiple doses 4-MTA where researched exist up to date.

Chemistry
In a procedure analogous to the production of other amphetamines, 4-MTA has been prepared from 4-(methylthio)phenylacetone by the Leuckart reaction and the reaction byproducts have been characterized.

Metabolism 

4-MTA undergoes limited biotransformation, the metabolic pathways of the metabolites in humans is postulated in the following steps:
 β-Hydroxylation of the side chain to 4-hydroxy-4-methylthioamphetamine (step I).
 Ring hydroxylation to a phenolic structure (step II).
 Oxidative deamination to form an oxo metabolite, followed by (step III):
 reduction into the corresponding alcohol (step IIIa),
 degradation of the side chain to 4-methylthiobenzoic acid (step IIIb).

The main metabolite was identified as 4-methylthiobenzoic acid. This compound leads to bioactivation (toxification), since the metabolite increases dramatically the sensitivity to the reduction in ATP content. The biotransformation shows great similarities to the metabolic pathway of the structurally related 4-methoxyamphetamine

See also 
 Aleph (psychedelic)
 Para-methoxyamphetamine
 4-Fluoroamphetamine
 Parachloroamphetamine

References

External links 
 
Erowid 4-MTA vault

Monoamine oxidase inhibitors
Substituted amphetamines
Thioethers
Designer drugs
Serotonin releasing agents